Lytoceratinae is a subfamily of ammonoid cephalopods that make up part of the family Lytoceratidae.

Description
They are characterized by shells in which the whorls bear growth lines or lamellar folds, or both, commonly corresponding to constrictions in the internal mold.  The external suture, that not lying against the previous whorl, has two lateral lobes (per side), the first being much larger. The internal lobe, which  lies against the previous whorl, has a cruciform dorsal lobe.

Fossil range
Lytoceratinae has a long stratigraphic and temporal range (196.5 to 89.3 Ma ) extending from the Early Jurassic Pliensbachian to the Late Cretaceous Cenomanian, although most included genera have much shorter ranges.

Lytoceras, the type genus, ranges from Early Jurassic to early late Cretaceous.

Ptycholytoceras is confined to the Early Jurassic Toarcian, while Hemilytoceras is present in the Late Jurassic Oxfordian-Tithonian.

Five genera are known from the Early Cretaceous. Pterolytoceras and Metalytoceras from the  Valanginian (Petrolytoceras may extend back to the Tithonian), Eulytoceras from the Hauterivian - Barremian, Argonauticeras and Pictetia from the Aptian - Albian.  Ammonoceratites ranges from the Aptian to the Cenomanian.

References

 W.J.Arkell, B.Kummel,& C.W.Wright 1957. Mesozoic Ammonoidea, Treatise on Invertebrate Paleontology, Part L Ammonoidea. R.C.Moore, (ed).

Pliensbachian first appearances
Cenomanian extinctions
Prehistoric animal subfamilies
Lytoceratidae